Laurent Petitgirard (born 10 June 1950, in Paris) is a French classical composer and conductor.

Biography and career 
Laurent Petitgirard studied piano with Serge Petitgirard and composition with Alain Kremski. He has worked as conductor with dozens of orchestras, including the Paris Opera Orchestra, Orchestre Philharmonique de Monte-Carlo, Orchestre National de France, Utah Symphony Orchestra, Orchestre de la Suisse Romande, National Orchestra of Spain, Moscow State Orchestra, China National Symphonic Orchestra and many others. In 1989 he founded the Orchestre Symphonique Français which he conducted until 1996, and also directed the Festival and the Academy of Flaine from 1986 to 1997. He has been the music director of the Orchestre Colonne, in Paris, since December 2004 and ended his contract two years before the end in April 2018 to concentrate on composition and guest conducting. He will still conduct the Colonne Orchestra, as a guest conductor, in the next seasons.

Petitgirard has recorded dozens of CDs of music by a variety of composers, such as Honegger, Ravel, Dukas, Debussy, Saint-Saëns and others.

As composer, Petitgirard has written scores for films by Otto Preminger, Jacques Demy, Francis Girod, Peter Kassovitz, Pierre Granier Deferre, and many others, with many of his film soundtracks being released on CD. He composed the theme and various incidental music for the television program Maigret.

Petitgirard's first opera, Joseph Merrick, The Elephant Man, was premiered in 2002 by the Prague State Opera, with Petitgirard conducting. Petigirard later recorded the opera for the Naxos label with the Orchestre Philharmonique de Monte-Carlo and with Nathalie Stutzmann in the title role.

Other works by Petigirard include Le Fou d'Elsa, a cycle of six songs to poems by Louis Aragon for mezzo and orchestra, Le Plus Ardent à Vivre, a septet with harp, Poème for large string orchestra, and Dialogue for viola and orchestra. Petitgirard's second opera, Guru, was released on the Naxos label in 2011 and its stage premiere occurred on 28 September 2018 in a production directed by Damian Cruden for Opera Na Zamku in Szczecin (Poland), with the composer conducting. Many of his other works are also available on the Naxos label, with the composer conducting.

Petitgirard has received a number of prizes, including the Young Composer's Prize of the SACD in 1987, the SACEM Prize in 1990, the Grand Prix Lycéen for Composers in 2000 for his Cello Concerto, and the Prix Musique 2001 of the SACD for his opera Joseph Merrick, The Elephant Man. In December 2000 he was elected Member of the French Institute, and elected Perpetual Secretary of the beaux-arts Academy on 1 February 2017 .

Laurent Petitgirard is a "Commandeur des Arts et Lettres", an "Officier de La Légion d'Honneur" and "Officier de l'Ordre National du Mérite".

References

External links
 Laurent Petitgirard's web site
 Laurent Petitgirard's biography and discography on the Naxos web site
 
 
 

1950 births
Living people
French composers
French male composers
Officers of the Ordre national du Mérite
Composers for harp